The men's downhill competition of the PyeongChang 2018 Olympics was held on Thursday, 15 February, at the Jeongseon Alpine Centre in PyeongChang. Scheduled for Sunday, 11 February, winds in excess of  forced officials to postpone the race four days.

Summary
The defending champion was Matthias Mayer. Other competitors included the 2014 silver medalist Christof Innerhofer, the bronze medalist Kjetil Jansrud, as well as the 2010 silver medalist Aksel Lund Svindal. Through 2018, the Olympic men's downhill has yet to have a repeat champion.

Aksel Lund Svindal won the gold medal, with a slight advantage over Kjetil Jansrud (silver) and Beat Feuz (bronze), who gained his first Olympic medal.

Qualification

A total of up to 320 alpine skiers qualified across all eleven events. Athletes qualified for this event by having met the A qualification standard only, which meant having 80 or less FIS Points and being ranked in the top 500 in the Olympic FIS points list. The Points list takes into average the best results of athletes per discipline during the qualification period (July 1, 2016 to January 21, 2018). Countries received additional quotas by having athletes ranked in the top 30 of the current World Cup season (two per gender maximum, overall across all events). After the distribution of B standard quotas (to nations competing only in the slalom and giant slalom events), the remaining quotas were distributed using the Olympic FIS Points list, with each athlete only counting once for qualification purposes. A country could only enter a maximum of four athletes for the event.

Results
The race was started at 11:30 local time, (UTC+9).

References

Men's alpine skiing at the 2018 Winter Olympics